Paudie Coffey (born 15 May 1969) is an Irish former Fine Gael politician who served as a Minister of State from 2014 to 2016. He served as a Senator from 2016 to 2020, after being nominated by the Taoiseach, and previously from 2007 to 2011 for the Industrial and Commercial Panel. He was a Teachta Dála (TD) for the Waterford constituency from  2011 to 2016.

Political career
He was first elected to Waterford County Council in 1999 for the Suir local electoral area, and re-elected in 2004. He was an unsuccessful candidate at the 2007 general election for the Waterford constituency, but was subsequently elected to Seanad Éireann in July 2007 as a Senator for the Industrial and Commercial Panel.

Coffey was elected for the Waterford constituency at the 2011 general election gaining 9,698 (18.1%) first preference votes and was subsequently elected. On 15 July 2014, he was appointed as Minister of State at the Department of the Environment, Community and Local Government with responsibility for Housing, Planning and Co-ordination of the Construction 2020 Strategy. He lost his seat at the 2016 general election.

Coffey was instrumental in the introduction of the Construction Contracts Act 2013. The Act regularises payment terms between construction companies, and puts in place a dispute resolution process aimed at reducing days lost and costs on construction projects.

He was nominated by the Taoiseach Enda Kenny to the 25th Seanad in May 2016.

Kilkenny People court case
Coffey alleged he was defamed by the Kilkenny People newspaper on 15 January 2016. He was nicknamed 'Coffey the Robber' after the newspaper published an article containing a press release by Carlow-Kilkenny Fine Gael TD John Paul Phelan. The comparison was based on William Crotty, who was an 18th-century criminal known as Crotty the Robber. Coffey settled out of court on 31 July 2019.

Retirement
On 16 December 2019, he announced that he was retiring from politics and would not contest the next general election.

References

External links
 

1969 births
Living people
Alumni of University College Dublin
Fine Gael TDs
Local councillors in County Waterford
Members of the 23rd Seanad
Members of the 25th Seanad
Members of the 31st Dáil
Ministers of State of the 31st Dáil
Nominated members of Seanad Éireann
Fine Gael senators
Alumni of Waterford Institute of Technology